The Canada Aviation and Space Museum (formerly the Canada Aviation Museum and National Aeronautical Collection) is Canada's national aviation history museum. The museum is located in Ottawa, Ontario, Canada, at the Ottawa/Rockcliffe Airport.

History

The museum was first formed in 1964 at RCAF Station Rockcliffe as the National Aeronautical Collection from the amalgamation of three separate existing collections. These included the National Aviation Museum at Uplands, which concentrated on early aviation and bush flying; the Canadian War Museum collection, which concentrated on military aircraft, and which included many war trophies, some dating back to World War One, and the RCAF Museum which focused on those aircraft operated by the Royal Canadian Air Force.
 
In 1982 the collection was renamed the National Aviation Museum and in 1988 the collection was moved to a new experimental type triangular hangar from the Second World War-era wooden hangars it had been residing in. In 2006 an additional hangar was opened, which allows all of the collection's aircraft to be stored indoors.

The museum closed 2 September 2008 for remodeling and rearrangement of the aircraft on display. This project was completed and the museum reopened 19 November 2008. The changes made include making space for a new exhibition entitled Canadian Wings: A Remarkable Century of Flight that was unveiled on 23 February 2009, the centennial of the first heavier than air aircraft flight in Canada.

In December 2008, the museum announced that approval had been granted for a C$7M expansion to begin in May 2009 and to be completed by the fall of 2010. The improvements carried out included an addition of 2600 m2 (28,000 ft²) giving 18% more space and providing room for a new foyer, auditorium, cafeteria, retail space, a landscaped entrance and classrooms.

In April 2010, the parent Canada Science and Technology Museum Corporation announced that the museum would be expanded and that its name would be changed to the "Canada Aviation and Space Museum" in May 2010. The Canadian Press expressed concern that the name change would cause confusion with the existing Toronto-based Canadian Air and Space Museum.

Organization
The Canada Aviation and Space Museum is under the control of Ingenium, previously known as the Canadian Science and Technology Museums Corporation. Ingenium is an autonomous Crown corporation which works to preserve and protect Canada's scientific and technical heritage. The corporation is responsible for three museums: the Canada Aviation and Space Museum, the Canada Agriculture Museum and the Canada Science and Technology Museum.

The museum is also home to 51 Canada Aviation Museum Squadron, Royal Canadian Air Cadets.

Collection
The museum's collection contains a wide variety of civilian and military aircraft, representing the history of Canadian aviation from the pioneer era before the First World War up to the present day.  Particularly noteworthy is the collection of vintage bushplanes from the 1920s to the 1940s.  The military aircraft represent aircraft flown by Canadians in the First World War, Second World War, and the Cold War.  The museum's best known exhibit is the surviving components of the Avro Arrow interceptor from the late 1950s.

Also at the museum is Space Shuttle Endeavours Canadarm, the Space Shuttles' Canadian-built robotic arm. It was unveiled on 2 May 2013 with Chris Hadfield on hand from the International Space Station via video screen to aid with the unveiling. While Endeavours Canadarm, officially known as Canadarm 201, was moved back to Canada, Atlantis's and Discovery's Canadarms went to the museums of their respective Shuttles.

Also on site are interactive activities on the science of flight, films, demonstrations, a boutique, and guided tours.

A few of the tours take the visitors "behind the scenes" to see conservation and restoration work in progress, and components which are in storage.

Aircraft in collection

Affiliations
The museum is affiliated with: CMA, CHIN, and Virtual Museum of Canada.

See also

Canada Science and Technology Museum Corporation
History of aviation in Canada
List of aerospace museums
Military history of Canada
Organization of Military Museums of Canada

Notes

References

Bibliography

External links 

 
 Canada Aviation Museum floor plan Fall 2008
 Canada Aviation Museum Exhibit Photos
 Canada Aviation Museum Photos
 51 Canada Aviation Museum Squadron – Royal Canadian Air Cadets

Aviation history of Canada
Aerospace museums in Ontario
Museums in Ottawa
Aviation and Space
Museums established in 1964
1964 establishments in Ontario
Ingenium